Tiffin carriers or dabbas are a kind of lunch box used widely in Asia and the Caribbean for tiffin meals. From India, they spread to Indonesia, Malaysia, Singapore, Guyana, Suriname and Trinidad and Tobago, where they are now widely used. They are also used extensively in Hungary, primarily to transport restaurant meals for consumption at home. The Hungarian version typically contains soup, a main course, and piece of cake. A very similar device is called Henkelmann in Germany. It is usually round or oval similar to military mess kits. The Henkelmann was very popular until the 1960s, but is very rarely used by Germans today.

In the Indian city of Mumbai, there is a complex and efficient delivery system that regularly delivers hot lunches packed in dabbas to city office workers from their suburban homes or from a caterer. It uses delivery workers known as dabbawalas.

The book Tiffin: An Untold Story covers 172 tiffin carriers, some over a century old.

Nomenclature
Tiffin carriers are known as rantang in Indonesian; mangkuk tingkat ('leveled bowls') in Malay; while in Thai they are known as Pin To ( [ˈpìn ˈtoː]), and in Cambodia it is called Chan Srak. In Hokkien they are called Uánn-tsân. In Arab countries they are called safartas (سفرطاس, from Turkish "sefer tası" meaning 'travel bowls').  The Hungarian word for a tiffin box is éthordó ('food carrier').

Design and materials
Normally these containers come with two or three tiers, although more elaborate versions can have four. The bottom tier, sometimes larger than the others, is the one usually used for rice. Tiffin carriers are opened by unlocking a small catch on either side of the handle. Tiffin carriers are generally made out of steel and sometimes of aluminium, but enamel and plastic versions have been made by European companies.

See also

Dabbawala
Lunch box
 Sagejū, historical Japanese picnic container set to carry bento
The Lunchbox (2013 Indian film)

References

Bibliography 

 J. Prakash & M. Punita (2020) Tiffin: An Untold Story

Further reading 

 
 
 

Food storage containers
Indian food preparation utensils
Serving and dining
Bangladeshi food preparation utensils